Aaron Stiles (born August 20, 1979) is an American politician and lawyer.

Stiles served in the Oklahoma Air National Guard and attended the University of Oklahoma. He later worked as a lawyer. Stiles first ran for a seat on the Oklahoma House of Representatives in 2008, losing to incumbent Wallace Collins. Stiles, a Republican, defeated Collins in 2010, and won reelection against Paula Roberts in 2012. Stiles lost his seat to Claudia Griffith in 2014. After stepping down from the Oklahoma House, Stiles returned the practice of law.

References

1979 births
Living people
Oklahoma lawyers
University of Oklahoma alumni
Republican Party members of the Oklahoma House of Representatives
Oklahoma National Guard personnel